Cetatea Pătulului is a Roman-Byzantine fortification, identified by some with the Roman name FLAVIANA (not Flaviana Castra), situated 2 km northwest of Cochirleni, Rasova commune, Romania.

Notes

External links 
 cIMeC entry

Ancient Roman buildings and structures in Romania
Buildings and structures in Constanța County
Roman legionary fortresses in Romania
History of Dobruja